Euproctis purpureofasciata is a moth of the family Erebidae. It is found in Taiwan.

The wingspan is 21–26 mm. Adults are on wing from May to October.

References

Moths described in 1914
Lymantriinae